Meat on the bone, also called bone-in meat is meat that is sold with some or all of the bones included in the cut or portion, i.e. meat that has not been filleted. The phrase "on the bone" can also be applied to specific types of meat, most commonly ham on the bone, and to fish. Meat or fish on the bone may be cooked and served with the bones still included or the bones may be removed at some stage in the preparation.

Examples of meat on the bone include T-bone steaks, chops, spare ribs, chicken leg portions and whole chicken. Examples of fish on the bone include unfilleted plaice and some cuts of salmon.

Meat on the bone is used in many traditional recipes.

Effect on flavor and texture 
The principal effect of cooking meat on the bone is that it alters the flavour and texture. Albumen and collagen in the bones release gelatin when boiled which adds substance to stews, stocks, soups and sauces. The bone also conducts heat within the meat so that it cooks more evenly and prevents meat drying out and shrinking during cooking.

Eating 
Consumption methods vary by size; smaller bones can be eaten whole, while larger ones can be broken or gnawed.

Some meat on the bone is most commonly eaten by picking it up, notably ribs and chicken (particularly wings and drumsticks). Others are primarily eaten by cutting off the meat, such as steaks, but possibly picking up and gnawing the bone when otherwise finished.

Smaller fish are often eaten whole, with the bones. Examples include whitebait of all sorts, anchovies, and smelt. 

In some cases the bone marrow may also be eaten, notably for beef or poultry (especially chicken), in the later case by the eater breaking or chewing off the end of a soft leg bone and sucking the marrow out.

Cooking 
Meat on the bone typically cooks slower than boneless meat when roasted in a joint. Individual bone-in portions such as chops also take longer to cook than their filleted equivalents.

Value for money 
Meat on the bone is quicker and easier to butcher as there is no filleting involved. Filleting is a skilled process that adds to labour and wastage costs as meat remaining on the bones after filleting is of low value (although it can be recovered). As a result, meat on the bone can be better value for money. However, relative value can be hard to judge as the bone part of the product is undesirable in many cultures, for larger bones are inedible. Various portions may contain a greater or lesser proportion of bone.

Ease of handling 
The presence of bones may make meat products more bulky, irregular in shape, and difficult to pack. Bones may make preparation and carving difficult. However, bones can sometimes be used as handles to make the meat easier to eat.

Import restrictions 
Foot-and-mouth disease (FMD) is a contagious disease affecting cloven-hoofed animals. Because FMD rarely infects humans but spreads rapidly among animals, it is a much greater threat to the agriculture industry than to human health.

FMD can be contracted by contact with infected meat, with meat on the bone representing a higher risk than filleted meat. As a result, import of meat on the bone remains more restricted than that of filleted meat in many countries.

Health issues

Injury 
Meat and fish served on the bone can present a risk of accident or injury. Small, sharp fish bones are the most likely to cause injury although sharp fragments of meat bone can also cause problems. Typical injuries include bones being swallowed and becoming trapped in the throat, and bones being trapped under the tongue.

Discarded bones can also present a risk of injury to pets or wild animals as some types of cooked meat bone break into sharp fragments when chewed.

BSE 
Bovine spongiform encephalopathy (BSE), also known as "mad cow disease", is a fatal brain disease affecting cattle. It is believed by most scientists that the disease may be transmitted to human beings who eat the brain or spinal cord of infected carcasses. In humans, it is known as new variant Creutzfeldt–Jakob disease (vCJD or nvCJD), and is also fatal.

The largest outbreak of BSE was in the United Kingdom, with several other countries affected to a lesser extent. The outbreak started in 1984, and continued into the 1990s, leading to increasing concern among governments and beef consumers as the risk to humans became known, but could not be quantified. Many countries banned or restricted the import of beef products from countries affected by BSE.

Animal brain and spinal cord had already been removed from the human and animal food chain when, in 1997, prion infection was also detected in the dorsal root ganglia within the spinal column of infected animals. As a result, beef on the bone was banned from sale in the UK as a precaution. This led to criticism that the government was overreacting. The European Union also considered banning beef and lamb on the bone. The UK ban lasted from December 1997 to December 1999, when it was lifted and the risk from beef on the bone declared negligible.

Use as a metaphor 
The phrase "meat on the bones" is used metaphorically to mean substance. For example, "I expect that we'll start putting some meat on the bones of regulatory reform" indicates an intention to add detail and substance to plans for regulatory reform and implies that these plans were previously only set out in broad or vague terms.

The phrase to "flesh out" relies of the same imagery in which a basic idea is likened to a skeleton or bones and the specific details of the idea to meat or flesh on that skeleton.

See also 

 Butcher
 Cut of beef
 List of beef dishes
 List of steak dishes
 Meat chop
 Steak
 Primal cut

References 

Cuts of meat